Tyler Biadasz (born November 20, 1997) is an American football center for the Dallas Cowboys of the National Football League (NFL). He played college football at Wisconsin and was drafted by the Cowboys in the fourth round of the 2020 NFL Draft.

Early years
Biadasz attended Amherst High School in Amherst, Wisconsin. He was named first-team all-state after his junior and senior seasons as a defensive tackle. The state coaches also named him honorable-mention All-state on offense both years.

As a senior, he registered 70 tackles, 7 sacks, 5 forced fumbles and one interception, while receiving the Tim Krumrie Award as the state of Wisconsin's top high school defensive lineman as a senior. He finished his high school career with 232 tackles, 19 sacks, 11 forced fumbles and 3 touchdowns. He also played basketball and baseball.

He committed to Wisconsin on June 8, 2015, after attending a camp on May 31 of that year. He chose Wisconsin over Illinois State, South Dakota State, Southern Illinois, and Western Illinois, all of whom also offered.

College career
Biadasz was redshirted and converted into a center. As a freshman, he started all 14 games, while receiving freshman All-American and third-team All-Big Ten honors.

As a sophomore, he again served as the anchor of the offensive line and started all 13 games. After the 2018 season, Biadasz consulted with the NFL Draft Advisory Committee and received a grade of "return to school".

In early 2019, Biadasz underwent hip surgery and missed spring practices. Before the season, he was named to preseason All-American teams by College Football News and Sporting News and was also identified as a candidate for the Rimington Award. He started all 14 games, became the first Rimington Trophy winner in school history as the nation's top center and was named a first-team All-American. He had arthroscopic surgery on the AC joint in his shoulder after the season.

In January 2020, Biadasz announced that he would forgo his senior season and declared for the 2020 NFL Draft. He started at center in all of the 41 games of his college career and helped block for running back Jonathan Taylor.

Professional career

Biadasz was selected by the Dallas Cowboys in the fourth round (146th overall) of the 2020 NFL Draft. As a rookie, he replaced an injured Joe Looney in the starting lineup of the fifth game against the New York Giants. He started 4 straight games, until suffering a hamstring injury during warmups in the ninth game against the Pittsburgh Steelers. He was placed on injured reserve on November 21, 2020. He was activated on December 12, 2020. Looney started at center in the last 8 contests of the season.

In 2021, he began the Organized Team Activities in the preseason as the starter at center.

After the 2022 season, he was selected to his first Pro Bowl.

Personal life
Biadasz's parents are dairy farmers, and he credits his times on the farm to build his work ethic.

References

External links

Wisconsin Badgers bio

1997 births
Living people
People from Portage County, Wisconsin
Players of American football from Wisconsin
American football centers
Wisconsin Badgers football players
All-American college football players
Dallas Cowboys players
National Conference Pro Bowl players